The 1985 World Table Tennis Championships men's singles was the 38th edition of the men's singles championship. 

Jiang Jialiang defeated Chen Longcan in the final, winning three sets to nil to secure the title.

Results

See also
List of World Table Tennis Championships medalists

References

-